Paulo is a Portuguese, Spanish, Swiss, and Italian masculine given name equivalent to English Paul. Notable people with the name include: 
Paul O (born 1967), Nigerian event promoter and music director executive 
Paulo Jr.
Paulo Jr. (footballer)
Paulo Almeida, Brazilian footballer 
Paulo André Cren Benini (born 1983), Brazilian football defender
Paulo Angeles (born 1997), Filipino actor, singer and dancer
Paulo Avelino (born 1988), Filipino actor and film actor
Paulo de Carvalho (born 1947), Portuguese singer-songwriter and actor
Paulo Coelho (born 1947), Brazilian lyricist and novelist
Paulo Fernando Craveiro, Brazilian author
Paulo Freire (1921–1997), Brazilian educator and philosopher
Paulo R. Holvorcem, Brazilian amateur astronomer, a prolific discoverer of asteroids
Paulo Jorge (disambiguation)
Paulo Kanoa (1802–1885), Governor of Kauaʻi
Paulo P. Kanoa (1832–1895), Governor of Kauaʻi 
Paulo Miklos (born 1959), Brazilian multi-instrumentalist, musician and actor
Paulo Antonio de Oliveira (born 1982), Brazilian football striker
Paulo Orlando (born 1985), Brazilian-born Major League Baseball player
Paulo Ribenboim, (born 1928) is a Brazilian-born mathematician who specializes in number theory
Paulo Rogério da Silva (born 1970), also known as Gero Camilo, Brazilian actor, director, poet and musician
Paulo Santos, several people
Paulo Dybala (born 1993), Argentine professional footballer also called “La Joya”

Fictional characters
Paulo (Lost), a character in the television series Lost
Paulo Bardosa, a character in the television series Footballers' Wives
Paulo, a character from Pokémon Masters EX

See also
Paulo (surname)
São Paulo (disambiguation)
 An alternative name used in Australia for wine made from the Palomino grape
 Pablo
 Paolo
 Pavel
 Paul
 
Paulão
Paulinho
João Paulo

Portuguese masculine given names